Umbilicus horizontalis, the horizontal navelwort, is a fleshy perennial flowering plant in the family Crassulaceae (in the genus Umbilicus) native to the Mediterranean Basin and Middle East, from the Azores in the west to Oman in the east in rocky habitats.

The thickly clustered, bell-shaped flowers are pale green, and grow in a raceme perpendicular to the spike, unlike common navelwort, whose flowers droop (thus the term "horizontal").

Horizontal navelwort is similar to common navelwort in many respects, but is noticeably more succulent.

Literature
 Mediterranean Wild Flowers, Marjorie Blamey & Christopher Grey-Wilson, HarperCollinsPublishers, 1993,

References

External links
 http://www.theplantlist.org/tpl1.1/search?q=Umbilicus+horizontalis

horizontalis
Flora of Lebanon
Flora of Malta